Henricia leviuscula, commonly called the Pacific blood star, it is a species of sea star found along the Pacific coast of North America.

Description 
They can usually be identified by their bright orange-red color, but there can also be many variations from tan to almost purple.  The disk can be a mottled gray color.  There can also be a saddle-like marking of lilac blotches between the rays, but the rays are not mottled. They commonly have 5 rays (occasionally 4–6). The rays are smooth and appear smooth due to the lack of pedicellariae and spines.  The species is relatively small; the diameter is usually over 8 cm and rarely gets larger than 12 cm.  As with all seastars the blood star has a madreporite which can be seen in the image below.

Reproduction and life history 
Sexes are dioecious and females are not known to brood young. This statement is in conflict with other sources that state that smaller females brood their young and larger females discharge eggs directly in the water and do not brood them.  This is one reason that is leading biologists to believe this is a species complex.
Embryonic stages do not adhere to one another but float freely. Post-hatching larvae are ciliated and swim.  Spawned eggs have been measured at 1342 μm diameter.

Behavior 
In a study comparing seastar righting behavior the Henricia leviuscula twisted arms 1 and 3 toward each other, used arms 4 and 5 to support itself on the bottom of the tank, and moved arm 2 up so it was in a sitting-like position, and began to flip itself over. Overall, it had an average righting time of 15.22 minutes.

Distribution 
Its range is from Alaska to Baja California.

Habitat 
Its habitat is the intertidal zone under rocks and protected places from the low-tide line to about 400 m deep.  They often have a commensal scaleworm, Arctonoe vittata.

Associations 
There may be hybrids and possible distinct species that key to Henricia leviuscula. Subspecies are Henricia leviuscula annectens and Henricia leviuscula levivuscula.

Trophic strategy 
They mainly feed on sponges and small bacteria. The sea star moves these tiny particles, which are captured in mucus and swept to the mouth by ciliated tracts. It may also feed by applying the stomach to the surfaces of sponges and bryozoa.

Conservation status 
Not listed.  Predators are humans and birds.

Related names 
Chaetaster californicus Grube, 1856  synonym
Cribrella laeviuscula Sladen, 1889  synonym
Cribrella laeviuscula Whiteaves, 1878  synonym
Henricia attenuata H.L. Clark, 1901  synonym
Henricia inequalis Verrill, 1914  synonym
Henricia lunula Verrill, 1914  synonym
Henricia spatulifera Verrill, 1909  synonym
Linckia leviuscula Stimpson, 1857  synonym

Common names 
Pacific blood star, Blood star, Blood star fish.

Notes

References
Lester B. Pearson College. (2001, December 1). Henricia leviuscula. Retrieved May 8, 2010, from Racerocks.com: http://www.racerocks.com/racerock/eco/taxalab/taniam.htm
Catalogue of Life. (2008). Retrieved May 8, 2010, from Species 2000: http://www.catalogueoflife.org/annual-checklist/2008/browse_taxa.php?selected_taxon=991569
Cowles, D. (2005). Henricia leviuscula. Retrieved May 8, 2010, from Key to Invertebrates Found At or Near Rosario Beach: http://www.google.com/imgres?
Douglas J. Eernise, M. F. (2010). Henricia pumila sp. nov.: A brooding seastar (Asteroidea) from the coastal. Retrieved May 11, 2010, from http://www.mapress.com/zootaxa/2010/f/zt02329p036.pdf
imgurl=http://www.wallawalla.edu/academics/departments/biology/rosario/inverts/Echinodermata/Class%2520Asteroidea/Henricia_leviuscula4sDLC2005.jpg&imgrefurl=http://www.wallawalla.edu/academics/departments/biology/rosario/inver
Henricia leviuscula (Stimpson, 1857). (2010, May 7). Retrieved May 7, 2010, from Encyclopedia of Life: http://www.eol.org/pages/598509
Kozloff, E. N. (1996). Marine Invertebrates of the Pacific Northwest. Seattle : University of Washington Press.
Kozloff, E. N. (1993). Seashore Life of the Northern Pacific Coast. Seattle: University of Washington Press.
Meinkoth, N. A. (1981). National Audubon Society Field Guide to North America Seashore Creatures. New York: Chanticleer Press, Inc.
Sarah Pearson, S. P. (2008, July 11). Righting Behavior of Sea Stars. Retrieved May 2010, 8, from https://scholarsbank.uoregon.edu/xmlui/bitstream/handle/1794/7841/Pearson-Pedemonte.pdf?sequence=1

External links 
 https://web.archive.org/web/20100722122347/http://seanet.stanford.edu/RockyShore/Echinodermata/index.html#Henricia
 http://enature.com/fieldguides/detail.asp?allSpecies=y&searchText=henricia%20leviuscula&curGroupID=8&lgfromWhere=&curPageNum=1
 https://web.archive.org/web/20100602122044/http://www.wallawalla.edu/academics/departments/biology/rosario/inverts/Echinodermata/Class%20Asteroidea/Henricia_leviuscula.html
 https://web.archive.org/web/20110725043229/http://bayscience.org/Animals/H/Henricia_leviuscula/
 

Echinasteridae
Starfish described in 1857